Bruce Barton Holmes (born October 24, 1965) is a former American football linebacker who played two seasons in the National Football League (NFL) with the Kansas City Chiefs and Minnesota Vikings. He was drafted by the Chiefs in the twelfth round of the 1987 NFL Draft. He played college football at the University of Minnesota and attended Henry Ford High School in Detroit, Michigan. Holmes was also a member of the Toronto Argonauts, Ottawa Rough Riders and BC Lions of the Canadian Football League (CFL).

College career
Holmes played for the Minnesota Golden Gophers from 1983 to 1986. He was named First-team All-Big Ten in 1986 by the coaches. He was the defensive MVP of the 1985 Independence Bowl.

Professional career
Holmes was selected by the Kansas City Chiefs of the NFL with the 325th pick in the 1987 NFL Draft. He played in three games, all starts, for the Chiefs during the 1987 season. He played in seventeen games for the CFL's Toronto Argonauts from 1988 to 1989. Holmes played in 22 games for the Ottawa Rough Riders of the CFL from 1989 to 1990. He earned CFL East All-Star honors in 1990. He played in eleven games for the BC Lions of the CFL during the 1991 season. Holmes played in two games for the Toronto Argonauts in 1992. He played in one game for the NFL's Minnesota Vikings in 1993.

References

External links
Just Sports Stats
College stats

Living people
1965 births
Players of American football from El Paso, Texas
American football linebackers
Canadian football linebackers
African-American players of American football
African-American players of Canadian football
Minnesota Golden Gophers football players
Kansas City Chiefs players
Toronto Argonauts players
Ottawa Rough Riders players
BC Lions players
Minnesota Vikings players
Sportspeople from El Paso, Texas
National Football League replacement players
Henry Ford High School (Detroit, Michigan) alumni
21st-century African-American people
20th-century African-American sportspeople